Jennifer Beck (born January 3, 1967) is an American Republican Party politician who served in the New Jersey State Senate representing the 11th Legislative District from 2012 to 2018. Prior to redistricting, she served in the Senate from 2008 to 2012 representing the 12th Legislative District, serving portions of Monmouth and Mercer counties. Beck represented the 12th District in the New Jersey General Assembly from 2006 to 2008.

Political career
Beck is a former Republican Party fundraiser who served for six years on the Red Bank Borough Council, from 1999 to 2005. She holds a B.A. from Boston College (Physics and Mathematics) and was awarded an M.A. from the University of Pennsylvania (Government Administration). Beck is also an alumna of the Fels Institute of Government at the University of Pennsylvania.

Beck won a very close Assembly election on November 8, 2005. As of December 6, 2005, she was declared winner of one of the seats, and was the top vote getter in the District with 31,418 votes. Democratic freshman Assemblyman Michael J. Panter won re-election with 30,466 votes, narrowly edging Beck's running mate, Declan O'Scanlon, who had 30,401 votes, just 65 fewer than Panter. One-term incumbent Robert Lewis Morgan lost his bid for re-election, coming in fourth with 30,228 votes. Two Green Party candidates each received about 2,000 votes.
While in the Assembly, Beck served on the Judiciary Committee, the State Government Committee and the Wagering, Tourism & Historic Preservation Committee.

In the 2007 general election, Beck won her bid for a seat in the New Jersey Senate in a race against Democratic candidate Ellen Karcher, in which Beck was outspent by a nearly seven-to-one margin. For the 2011 elections, Beck was moved into the 11th District where she beat Democrat Raymond Santiago by over 13 points. She was subsequently reelected by over 21 points in 2013 beating Democrat Michael Brantley and independent Marie E. Amato-Juckiewicz. Beck currently serves on the Joint Committee on Economic Justice and Equal Employment Opportunity, the Budget and Appropriations Committee, and the Community and Urban Affairs Committee.

In November 2008, a petition was launched to urge the 2009 Republican nominee for Governor of New Jersey to select Beck as his/her lieutenant governor. Nevertheless, on July 20, 2009, nominee Chris Christie announced that he had chosen Kimberly Guadagno, Monmouth County sheriff, to complete his campaign ticket as a candidate for lieutenant governor.

Described by NJ.com as "perhaps the biggest upset of the night", Beck lost her bid for re-election in 2017 to Democratic challenger Vin Gopal, in what was the third-most expensive of the 120 legislative races statewide, with total spending in excess of $4 million. The district had been represented only by Republicans since 1992. With the addition of heavily Democratic communities like Asbury Park in the 2011 apportionment, Democrats gained a 32%-23% margin over Republicans in numbers of registered voters. Democrats Joann Downey and Eric Houghtaling won the two Assembly seats in 2015 and Gopal's win over Beck by an Election Day count of 28,750 votes to 25,108 put all three District 11 seats in the hands of Democrats.

Election history

References

External links 
Senator Jennifer Beck's Official Website
Senator Jennifer Beck's Official Senate Site
12th Legislative District Official Site
Senator Beck's legislative web page, New Jersey Legislature
New Jersey Legislature financial disclosure forms
2016 2015 2014 2013 2012 2011 2010 2009 2008 2007 2006 2005
Jennifer Beck, Project Vote Smart

1967 births
Boston College alumni
Fels Institute of Government alumni
Living people
New Jersey city council members
Republican Party New Jersey state senators
Republican Party members of the New Jersey General Assembly
Politicians from Erie, Pennsylvania
People from Red Bank, New Jersey
Politicians from Monmouth County, New Jersey
Women city councillors in New Jersey
Women state legislators in New Jersey
21st-century American politicians
21st-century American women politicians